The Henry Copeland House is a historic house on Arkansas Highway 14 in Pleasant Grove, a small community in southeastern Stone County, Arkansas.  It is a single-story wood-frame structure, built in a traditional dogtrot form with two pens and a breezeway.  Ells extend the house to the rear and off the northern pen.  A hip-roof porch extends across the front, supported by turned posts.  Built about 1895, the house is a fine local example of period vernacular architecture combining traditional forms with the then-fashionable Victorian styles.

The house was listed on the National Register of Historic Places in 1985.

See also
National Register of Historic Places listings in Stone County, Arkansas

References

Houses on the National Register of Historic Places in Arkansas
Houses completed in 1900
Houses in Stone County, Arkansas
National Register of Historic Places in Stone County, Arkansas